The 1952 football season was São Paulo's 23rd season since the club's founding in 1930.

Overall

{|class="wikitable"
|-
|Games played || 69 (9 Torneio Rio-São Paulo, 30 Campeonato Paulista, 30 Friendly match)
|-
|Games won || 43 (3 Torneio Rio-São Paulo, 21 Campeonato Paulista, 19 Friendly match)
|-
|Games drawn || 12 (2 Torneio Rio-São Paulo, 4 Campeonato Paulista, 6 Friendly match)
|-
|Games lost || 14 (4 Torneio Rio-São Paulo, 5 Campeonato Paulista, 5 Friendly match)
|-
|Goals scored || 149
|-
|Goals conceded || 81
|-
|Goal difference || +68
|-
|Best result || 5–0 (A) v Juventus - Friendly match - 1952.04.20  5–0 (H) v Portuguesa Santista - Campeonato Paulista - 1952.09.28
|-
|Worst result || 0–4 (A) v Fluminense - Torneio Rio-São Paulo - 1952.03.22  0–4 (A) v XV de Piracicaba - Friendly match - 1952.03.30 0–4 (H) v XV de Jaú - Campeonato Paulista - 1952.10.08
|-
|Most appearances || 
|-
|Top scorer || 
|-

Friendlies

Official competitions

Torneio Rio-São Paulo

Record

Campeonato Paulista

Record

External links
official website 

Association football clubs 1952 season
1952
1952 in Brazilian football